Payachata or Paya Chata (Aymara pä, paya two, Pukina chata mountain, "two mountains") is a north–south trending complex of potentially active volcanos on the border of Bolivia and Chile, directly north of Chungará Lake. The complex contains two peaks, Pomerape to the north and Parinacota to the south. On the Bolivian side the volcanoes are located in the Oruro Department, Sajama Province, Curahuara de Carangas Municipality, and on the Chilean side they lie in the Arica y Parinacota Region, Parinacota Province.

According to helium surface dating, Parinacota has erupted within the last 2000 years, while Pomerape is Pleistocene.

See also 
 List of volcanoes in Bolivia
 List of volcanoes in Chile

References

External links
 Los Payachatas all the way to Lake Chungará. See the trail and watch them magnificently on August 9, 2008

Volcanoes of Arica y Parinacota Region
Potentially active volcanoes
Complex volcanoes
Volcanic groups
Volcanoes of Oruro Department
Glaciers of Bolivia
Stratovolcanoes of Bolivia
Stratovolcanoes of Chile